Cleveland, Wisconsin, may refer to:

Cleveland, Chippewa County, Wisconsin, a town in Chippewa County, Wisconsin, United States
Cleveland, Jackson County, Wisconsin, a town in Jackson County, Wisconsin, United States
Cleveland (village), Wisconsin, a village in Manitowoc County, Wisconsin, United States
Cleveland, Marathon County, Wisconsin, a town in Marathon County, Wisconsin, United States
Cleveland, Taylor County, Wisconsin, a town in Taylor County, Wisconsin, United States